Jennythrips is a monotypic genus of thrips in the family Phlaeothripidae.

Species
 Jennythrips jasmini

References

Phlaeothripidae
Thrips genera
Monotypic insect genera